

The following is a list of ballets with entries in English Wikipedia. The entries are sorted alphabetically by ballet title, with the name of the composer (or the composer whose music the ballet is set to) and the year of the first performance.

Alphabetical listing

1
 2 and 3 Part Inventions, to music by Johann Sebastian Bach, 1994

A

 A Folk Tale, Johan Peter Emilius Hartmann and Niels W. Gade, 1854
 A Midsummer Night's Dream, to music by Felix Mendelssohn, 1964
 A Month in the Country, to music by Frédéric Chopin, 1976
 A Suite of Dances, to music by Johann Sebastian Bach, 1994
 A Tragedy of Fashion, to music by Eugene Aynsley Goossens, 1926
 Adam Zero, Arthur Bliss, 1946
 Adams Violin Concerto, to music by John Adams, 1995
 Adagio Hammerklavier, to music by Ludwig van Beethoven, 1973
 Afternoon of a Faun (Nijinsky), to music by Claude Debussy, 1912
 Afternoon of a Faun (Robbins), to music by Claude Debussy, 1953
 Afternoon of a Faun (Rushton), to music by Claude Debussy, 2006  
 After the Rain, to music by Arvo Pärt, 2005 
 Agon, Igor Stravinsky, 1957
 Alice's Adventures in Wonderland, Joby Talbot, 2011 
 Allegro Brillante, to music by Pyotr Ilyich Tchaikovsky, 1956
 An American in Paris, to music by George Gershwin, 2005
 El amor brujo, Manuel de Falla, 1915
 Anastasia, to music by Bohuslav Martinů, Pyotr Ilyich Tchaikovsky, Fritz Winckel, and Rüdiger Rüfer, 1967 
 Andantino, to music by Pyotr Ilyich Tchaikovsky, 1981
 Les Animaux modèles, Francis Poulenc, 1942
 Anna Karenina, to music by Pyotr Ilyich Tchaikovsky, 2005
 Antique Epigraphs, to music by Claude Debussy, 1984 
 Apollo, Igor Stravinsky, 1928
 Appalachia Waltz, Mark O'Connor and Edgar Meyer, 2000
 Appalachian Spring, Aaron Copland, 1944
 Arabian Nights, Fikret Amirov, 1979
 Arcade, to music by Igor Stravinsky, 1963
 Aschenbrödel, Johann Strauss II, 1901
 Ash, to music by Michael Torke, 1991 
 Astarte, Crome Syrcus, 1967
 Aubade, Francis Poulenc, 1929
 Les Aventures de Pélée, Ludwig Minkus, 1876

B

 Babek, Agshin Alizadeh, 1986
 Bacchus and Ariadne, Albert Roussel 1931
 Backchat, to music by Paul Lansky, 2004
 Le Baiser de la fée, Igor Stravinsky 1928
 Baldurs draumar, Geirr Tveitt, 1938
 Ballet Comique de la Reine, 1581
 Ballet de la Merlaison, 1635
 Ballet égyptien, Alexandre Luigini, 1875
 Ballet Royal de la Nuit, Jean-Baptiste Lully, 1653 
 Ballo della Regina, to music by Giuseppe Verdi, 1978
 Il ballo delle ingrate, Claudio Monteverdi, 1608
 The Bandits, Ludwig Minkus, 1875
 Bar aux Folies-Bergère, to music by Emmanuel Chabrier, 1934
 Barbe-Bleue, Peter Schenck, 1896
 Barber Violin Concerto, to music by Samuel Barber, 1988
 La Bayadère, Ludwig Minkus, 1877 
 Bayou, to music by Virgil Thomson, 1952
 The Beauty of Lebanon or The Mountain Spirit, Cesare Pugni, 1863
 Beethoven Romance, to music by Ludwig van Beethoven, 1989
 Bella Figura, to music by Lukas Foss, Giovanni Battista Pergolesi, Alessandro Marcello, Antonio Vivaldi, Giuseppe Torelli, 1995
 The Benevolent Cupid, Cesare Pugni, 1868 
 Les Biches, Francis Poulenc, 1924
 Billboards, to music by Prince, 1993
 Billy the Kid, Aaron Copland, 1938
 Birthday Offering, to music by Alexander Glazunov, 1956
 Black and White, Michael Torke, 1988 
 Blake Works I, to music by James Blake, 2016
 The Blue Dahlia, Cesare Pugni, 1860
 Le Bœuf sur le toit, Darius Milhaud, 1920 
 La Boîte à joujoux, Claude Debussy,  1919
 Boléro, Maurice Ravel, 1928 
 The Bolt, Dmitri Shostakovich, 1931
 Le Bourgeois Gentilhomme, to music by Richard Strauss, 1932
 La Boutique fantasque, Ottorino Respighi, 1919
 Brahms/Handel,  to music by Johannes Brahms, 1984
 Brahms–Schoenberg Quartet, to music by Johannes Brahms, 1966 
 Brandenburg, to music by Johann Sebastian Bach, 1997
 Broken Wings, Pater Salem, 2016
 Bugaku, Toshiro Mayuzumi, 1963

C

 The Cage, to music by Igor Stravinsky, 1951
 Camargo, Ludwig Minkus, 1872
 Carmen, to music by Georges Bizet, 1949 
 Carmen Suite, Georges Bizet adapted by Rodion Shchedrin, 1967
 Carnaval, to music by Robert Schumann, 1910 
 Carnival of the Animals, to music by Camille Saint-Saëns, 2003
 Caroline Mathilde, Peter Maxwell Davies, 1991
 Carousel, to music  by Richard Rodgers, 2002
 Catarina or La Fille du bandit, Cesare Pugni, 1846 
 Cave of the Heart, Samuel Barber, 1947
 The Cellist, Philip Feeney, 2020
 Chaconne, to music by Christoph Willibald Gluck, 1976 
 The Chairman Dances, John Adams, 1988
 Le Chant du rossignol, Igor Stravinsky, 1920
 Checkmate, Arthur Bliss, 1937
 Chichester Psalms, to music by Leonard Bernstein, 2004
 Chout, Sergei Prokofiev, 1921
 Chroma, Joby Talbot, 2006
 Cigale, Jules Massenet, 1904
 Cinderella (Fitinhof-Schell), Baron Boris Fitinhoff-Schell, 1893
 Cinderella (Prokofiev), Sergei Prokofiev, 1945
 Cinderella (Ashton), Sergei Prokofiev, 1948
 Circus Polka, Igor Stravinsky, 1942
 Cléopâtre, to music by Anton Arensky, Alexander Taneyev, Nikolai Rimsky-Korsakov, Mikhail Glinka, Alexander Glazunov, Modeste Mussorgsky, Nikolai Tcherepnin, 1909
 The Concert, to music by Frédéric Chopin, 1956
 Concerto, to music by Dmitri Shostakovich, 1966
 Concerto Barocco, to music by Johann Sebastian Bach, 1941
 Concerto DSCH, to music by Dmitri Shostakovich, 2008
 Le Conservatoire, to music arranged by Holger Simon Paulli, 1849
 Coppélia, Léo Delibes, 1870
 Correlazione, to music by Arcangelo Corelli, 1994
 Corroboree, John Antill, 1950
 Le Corsaire, Adolphe Adam, 1856
 Corybantic Games, to music by Leonard Bernstein, 2018
 La Création du monde, Darius Milhaud, 1923
 The Creatures of Prometheus, Ludwig van Beethoven 1801
 Creole Giselle, Adolphe Adam, 1984
 Cydalise et le Chèvre-pied, to music by Gabriel Pierné, 1924
 Le Cygne, Charles Lecocq, 1899

D

 Dance Panels, Aaron Copland, 1963
 Dance Preludes, to music by Witold Lutosławski, 1991
 Dances at a Gathering, to music by Frédéric Chopin, 1969
 Danses concertantes, to music by Igor Stravinsky, 1955
 Daphnis et Chloé, Maurice Ravel, 1912
 The Daughter of the Snows, Ludwig Minkus, 1879
 Delight of the Muses, Charles Wuorinen, 1992
 Deuce Coupe, to music by The Beach Boys, 1973
 Les Deux pigeons, André Messager, 1886
 Le Diable amoureux, Napoléon Henri Reber and François Benoist, 1840 
 Le Diable à quatre, Adolphe Adam, 1845
 Le Dieu bleu, Reynaldo Hahn, 1912
 Different Drummer, to music by Anton Webern and Arnold Schoenberg, 1984 
 The Display, Malcolm Williamson, 1964
 Divertimento No. 15, to music by Wolfgang Amadeus Mozart, 1956
 Don Juan, Christoph Willibald Gluck, 1761
 Don Quixote, Ludwig Minkus, 1869 
 Double Feature, to music by Irving Berlin and Walter Donaldson, 2004
 The Dream, to music by Felix Mendelssohn, 1964
 Duo Concertant, to music by Igor Stravinsky, 1972
 Dust, Jocelyn Pook, 2014
 Dybbuk, Leonard Bernstein, 1974
 The Dying Swan, to music by Camille Saint-Saëns, 1905

E

 Echo, to music by Michael Torke, 1989
 Ecstatic Orange, to music by Michael Torke, 1987
 Edward II, John McCabe, 1995
 Élégie, to music by Igor Stravinsky, 1982
 Elite Syncopations, to music by Scott Joplin, 1974
 The Enchanted Forest, Riccardo Drigo, 1887
 Enigma Variations, to music by Edward Elgar, 1968
 Episodes, to music by Anton Webern, 1959
 La Esmeralda, Cesare Pugni, 1844
 L'Etoile de Grenade, Cesare Pugni, 1855
 Études, to music by Carl Czerny, 1948
 L'Éventail de Jeanne, Maurice Ravel, Pierre-Octave Ferroud, Jacques Ibert, Alexis Roland-Manuel, Marcel Delannoy, Albert Roussel, Darius Milhaud, Francis Poulenc, Georges Auric,  Florent Schmitt, 1927
 Everywhere We Go, Sufjan Stevens, 2014

F

 Façade, to music by William Walton, 1931
 Fall River Legend, Morton Gould, 1948 
 Fancy Free, Leonard Bernstein, 1944
 Fanfare, to music by Benjamin Britten, 1953
 Faust, to music by Giacomo Panizza, Michael Costa, and Niccolò Bajetti, 1848
 Les Fêtes chinoises, Jean-Philippe Rameau, 1754
 Fiametta, Ludwig Minkus, 1863
 La Fille de marbre, Cesare Pugni, 1847
 La Fille du Danube, Adolphe Adam, 1836 
 La Fille mal gardée, to an arrangement of fifty-five popular French airs, 1789
 La Fille mal gardée (Ashton), Peter Ludwig Hertel, Ferdinand Hérold, John Lanchbery, 1960 
 La Fin du jour, to music by Maurice Ravel, 1979
 The Firebird, Igor Stravinsky, 1910
 Five, Charles Wuorinen, 1988
 Five Brahms Waltzes in the Manner of Isadora Duncan, to music by Johannes Brahms, 1976
 Five Movements, Three Repeats, to music by Max Richter and Clyde Otis, 2012
 Flames of Paris, Boris Asafyev, 1932
 Flight Pattern, to music by Henryk Górecki, 2017
 Flit of Fury/The Monarch, to music by Aaron Severini, 2008 
 Flore et Zéphire, Cesare Bossi, 1796
 Florida, Cesare Pugni, 1866
 Flower Festival in Genzano, to music by Edvard Helsted and Holger Simon Paulli, 1858
 A Folk Tale, Johan Peter Emilius Hartmann and Niels Gade, 1854
 The Fool on the Hill, to music by The Beatles, 1976 
 The Fountain of Bakhchisarai, Boris Asafyev, 1934
 Four Bagatelles, to music by Ludwig van Beethoven, 1974
 Four Last Songs, to music by Richard Strauss, 1970
 The Four Seasons, to music by Giuseppe Verdi, 1979
 The Four Temperaments, Paul Hindemith, 1946
 Franca Florio, regina di Palermo, Lorenzo Ferrero, 2007 
 Friandises, Christopher Rouse, 2006 
 Frizak the Barber, Ludwig Minkus, 1879

G

 Gaîté Parisienne, to music by Jacques Offenbach, 1938
 Gayane, Aram Khachaturian, 1942
 Les Gentilhommes, to music by George Frideric Handel, 1987
 Gershwin Piano Concerto, to music by George Gershwin, 1982
 The Girl in White, Robert J. Bradshaw, 2011 
 Giselle, Adolphe Adam, 1841
 Glass Pieces, to music by Philip Glass, 1983
 Gloria, to music by Francis Poulenc, 1980
 The Goldberg Variations, to music by Johann Sebastian Bach, 1971
 The Golden Age, Dmitri Shostakovich, 1930 
 The Good-Humoured Ladies, to music by Domenico Scarlatti, 1917
 Gorda, David Toradze, 1949
 Graduation Ball, to music by Johann Strauss II, 1940
 Grazioso, to music by Mikhail Glinka, 2007 
 Great Galloping Gottschalk, to music by Louis Moreau Gottschalk, 1982
 The Green Table, Fritz Cohen, 1932
 La Guiablesse, William Grant Still, 1927
 La Guirlande de Campra, Georges Auric, Arthur Honegger, Jean-Yves Daniel-Lesur, Alexis Roland-Manuel, Francis Poulenc, Henri Sauguet, Germaine Tailleferre, 1966

H

 Hallelujah Junction, to music by John Adams, 2001
 The Hard Nut, Pyotr Ilyich Tchaikovsky, 1991
 The Harlem Tulip, Baron Boris Fitinhoff-Schell, 1887
 Harnasie, Karol Szymanowski, 1935
 Las Hermanas, to music by Frank Martin, 1971
 Hérodiade, Paul Hindemith, 1944 
 L'Histoire de Manon, to music by Jules Massenet, 1974
 Homage to the Queen, Malcolm Arnold, 1953 
 L'Homme et son désir, Darius Milhaud, 1918
 Horoscope, Constant Lambert, 1938
 Hurry Up, We're Dreaming, to music by Anthony Gonzalez, Yann Gonzalez, Brad Laner and Justin Meldal-Johnsen, 2018

I

 I'm Old Fashioned, to music by Jerome Kern, 1983
 L'Île Enchantée, Arthur Sullivan, 1864
 Images to music by Claude Debussy, 1992
 Impressing the Czar, to music by Thom Willems, Leslie Stuck, and Ludwig van Beethoven, 1988
 In Creases, to music by Philip Glass, 2012
 The Incredible Flutist, Walter Piston, 1938
 In G Major, to music by Maurice Ravel, 1975
 Initials R.B.M.E., to music by Johannes Brahms, 1972
 In Memory Of ..., to music by Gustav Mahler and Johann Sebastian Bach, 1985
 In the Countenance of Kings, to music by Sufjan Stevens, 2016
 Interplay, to music by Morton Gould, 1945
 In the Mi(d)st, to music by Oliver Knussen, 2002
 In the Night, to music by Frédéric Chopin, 1970
 In Vento, Bruno Moretti, 2006
 The Invitation, Mátyás Seiber, 1960
 Isadora, to music by Richard Rodney Bennett, 1981
 Ives, Songs, to music by Charles Ives, 1988
 Ivesiana, to music by Charles Ives, 1954

J

 Jack in the Box, Erik Satie, 1926
 Jardin aux lilas, to music by Ernest Chausson, 1936 
 Jason et Médée, Jean-Joseph Rodolphe, 1763
 Jazz Calendar, Richard Rodney Bennett, 1968
 Jeu de cartes (Balanchine), Igor Stravinsky, 1937
 Le Jeune homme et la mort, to music by Johann Sebastian Bach, 1946
 Jeux, Claude Debussy, 1913 
 Jewels, to music by Gabriel Fauré, Igor Stravinsky, and Pyotr Ilyich Tchaikovsky, 1967
 Job: A Masque for Dancing, Ralph Vaughan Williams, 1931
 Josephslegende, Richard Strauss, 1914
 The Judas Tree, Brian Elias, 1992

K

 Kalkabrino, Léon Minkus, 1891
 Kammermusik No. 2, to music by Paul Hindemith, 1978
 Kënga e Rexhës, Akil Mark Koci, 1982
 The Kermesse in Bruges, to music by Holger Simon Paulli, 1851 
 Khamma, Claude Debussy, 1947
 The King's Command or The Pupils of Dupré, to music by Albert Vizentini, 1886

L

 The Lady and the Fool, to music by Giuseppe Verdi, 1954
 The Lady in the Ice, Jean-Michel Damase, 1953
 Lamentation, to music by Zoltán Kodály, 1930
 Laurencia, Alexander Crain, 1939
 Leda, the Swiss Milkmaid, Adalbert Gyrowetz, 1821
 Leili and Majnun, Gara Garayev, 1969
 Liebeslieder Walzer, to music by Johannes Brahms, 1960
 Lifecasting, to music by Steve Reich and Ryoji Ikeda, 2009
 The Limpid Stream, Dmitri Shostakovich, 1935
 The Little Humpbacked Horse, Cesare Pugni, 1864 
 Liturgy, to music by Arvo Pärt, 2003
 The Loves of Mars and Venus, to music by Jean-Baptiste Lully, Jacques Paisible, Henry Purcell, Gottfried Finger, John Eccles, Jeremiah Clarke, and William Croft, 1717
 Le Lys, Léon Minkus, 1869

M

 The Magic Flute, Riccardo Drigo, 1893
 The Magic Mirror, Arseny Koreshchenko, 1903
 The Magic Pills, Ludwig Minkus, 1866
 Maiden Tower, Afrasiyab Badalbeyli, 1940
 Mam'zelle Angot, Charles Lecocq, 1943
 Marguerite and Armand, to music by Franz Liszt, 1963
 Les Mariés de la tour Eiffel, Georges Auric, Arthur Honegger, Darius Milhaud, Francis Poulenc, Germaine Tailleferre, 1921
 A Marriage During the Regency, Cesare Pugni, 1858
 Les Masques, to music by Francis Poulenc, 1933
 Mayerling, to music by Franz Liszt, 1978
 Medea, Samuel Barber, 1946
 Mercure, Erik Satie, 1924
 Mercurial Manoeuvres, to music by Dmitri Shostakovich, 2000
 The Merry Widow, to music by Franz Lehár, 1975
 Metastaseis and Pithoprakta, to music by Iannis Xenakis, 1968
 Midnight Sun, to music by Nikolai Rimsky-Korsakov, 1915 
 Les Millions d'Arlequin, Riccardo Drigo, 1900
 Miracle in the Gorbals, Arthur Bliss, 1944  
 The Miraculous Mandarin, Béla Bartók, 1926
 Miss Sally's Party, William Grant Still, 1940
 Mlada, Ludwig Minkus, 1879
 Monotones, to music by Erik Satie, 1965
 Monumentum pro Gesualdo, to music by Igor Stravinsky, 1960
 The Moor's Pavane, to music by Henry Purcell, 1949
 Mother Goose, Maurice Ravel, 1975
 Moves, ballet without music, 1959
 Movements for Piano and Orchestra, to music by Igor Stravinsky, 1963
 Mozartiana, to music by Pyotr Ilyich Tchaikovsky, 1933
 My Brother, My Sisters, to music by Arnold Schoenberg and Anton Webern, 1978

N

 Napoli, to music by Edvard Helsted, Holger Simon Paulli, Niels Gade, 1842
 Narkissos, Robert Prince, 1966
 Nénuphar, Nikolai Krotkov, 1890
 The Newcomers, to music by David Diamond, 1988
 Night and Day, Ludwig Minkus, 1883
 Nightingale, Mikhail Kroshner, 1939  
 The Nightingale and the Rose, Bright Sheng, 2007
 Nine Sinatra Songs, to music by Frank Sinatra, 1982
 Noah and the Flood, to music by Igor Stravinsky, 1982
 Nobilissima Visione, Paul Hindemith, 1938
 Les Noces, Igor Stravinsky, 1923
 Noctambules, Humphrey Searle, 1956
 Notre-Dame de Paris, to music by Maurice Jarre, 1965
 The Nutcracker, Pyotr Ilyich Tchaikovsky, 1892
 The Nutcracker (Willam Christensen), Pyotr Ilyich Tchaikovsky, 1944
 The Nutcracker (Balanchine),  Pyotr Ilyich Tchaikovsky, 1954
 N.Y. Export: Op. Jazz, Robert Prince, 1958

O

 Ocean's Kingdom, Paul McCartney, 2011
 Octet (Christensen), to music by Igor Stravinsky, 1958
 Octet (Martins), to music by Felix Mendelssohn, 2003
 Ode, to music by Igor Stravinsky, 1972 
 Okon Fuoko, Leevi Madetoja, 1930
 Oltremare, Bruno Moretti, 2008
 Ondine, ou La Naïade, Cesare Pugni, 1843
 Ondine, Hans Werner Henze, 1958
 Onegin, to music by Pyotr Ilyich Tchaikovsky, 1965
 On the Dnieper, Sergei Prokofiev, 1932
 Opus 19/The Dreamer, to music by Sergei Prokofiev, 1979
 Les Orientales, to music by Alexander Glazunov, Christian Sinding, Anton Arensky and Edvard Grieg, 1910
 Orpheus, Igor Stravinsky, 1948
 Othello, Elliot Goldenthal, 1997
 Other Dances, to music by Frédéric Chopin, 1976
 Outlier, to music by Thomas Adès, 2010

P

 Le Papillon, Jacques Offenbach, 1860
 Pâquerette, François Benoist 1851
 Paquita, Ludwig Minkus, 1846
 Parade, Erik Satie, 1917
 The Parisian Market or Le Marché des innocents, Cesare Pugni, 1859
 Le Pas d'acier, Sergei Prokofiev, 1927
 Pas de Deux, to music by Anton von Webern, 1969
 Pas de légumes, to music by Gioachino Rossini, 1982
 Pas de Quatre, Cesare Pugni, 1845 
 The Path of Thunder, Gara Garayev, 1958
 Les Patineurs, to music by Giacomo Meyerbeer, 1937
 Le Pavillon d'Armide, Nikolai Tcherepnin, 1907
 La Péri (Burgmüller), Johann Friedrich Franz Burgmüller, 1843
 La Péri (Dukas), Paul Dukas 1912
 La Perle, Riccardo Drigo, 1896
 Les petits riens, Wolfgang Amadeus Mozart, 1778
 Petrushka, Igor Stravinsky, 1911 
 The Pharaoh's Daughter, Cesare Pugni, 1862
 Piano Pieces, to music by Pyotr Ilyich Tchaikovsky, 1981
 Piano-Rag-Music (Bolender), to music by Igor Stravinsky, 1972
 Piano-Rag-Music (Martins), to music by Igor Stravinsky, 1982  
 Pictures at an Exhibition, to music by Modest Mussorgsky, 2014
 Pillar of Fire, to music by Arnold Schoenberg, 1942
 Pineapple Poll, to music by Arthur Sullivan, 1951
 Pirates of Penzance – The Ballet!, to music by Arthur Sullivan, 1991
 Plainspoken, David Lang, 2010
 Play Without Words, Terry Davies, 2002
 Le Poisson doré, Ludwig Minkus, 1866
 Polyphonia, to music by György Ligeti, 2001
 The Prince of the Pagodas, Benjamin Britten, 1957
 The Prince of the Pagodas (MacMillan), Benjamin Britten, 1989
 Printemps, to music by Claude Debussy, 1972 
 The Prodigal Son, Sergei Prokofiev, 1929 
 The Prospect Before Us,  to music by William Boyce, 1940
 Pulcinella, Igor Stravinsky, 1920
 Pulcinella Variations, to music by Igor Stravinsky, 2017

Q

 Queen at the Ballet, to music by Queen, 2004

R

 Radio and Juliet, to music by Radiohead, 2005
 Ragtime (I), to music by Igor Stravinsky, 1960
 Ragtime (II), to music by Igor Stravinsky, 1966
 The Rake's Progress, Gavin Gordon, 1935
 RAkU, Shinji Eshima, 2011
 Raymonda, Alexander Glazunov, 1898
 Raymonda Variations, Alexander Glazunov, 1961 
 Red Detachment of Women, Du Mingxin, 1964
 The Red Poppy, Reinhold Glière, 1927 
 The Red Shoes, to music by Bernard Herrmann, 2016
 Relâche, Erik Satie, 1924
 Les Rendezvous, to music by Daniel Auber, 1933
 Requiem, to music by Gabriel Fauré, 1976
 Requiem Canticles (Robbins), to music by Igor Stravinsky, 1966 
 Requiem Canticles (Balanchine), to music by Igor Stravinsky, 1968 
 Le Réveil de Flore, Riccardo Drigo, 1894
 Rhapsody, to music by Sergei Rachmaninoff, 1980 
 The Rite of Spring, Igor Stravinsky, 1913
 The Rite of Spring (MacMillan), Igor Stravinsky, 1962
 River of Light, Charles Wuorinen, 1998
 Robert Schumann's Davidsbündlertänze, to music by Robert Schumann, 1980
 Robin Hood, to music by Erich Wolfgang Korngold, 1998
 Rococo Variations, to music by Pyotr Ilyich Tchaikovsky, 2008
 Rodeo, Aaron Copland, 1942
 Rodeo: Four Dance Episodes, to music by Aaron Copland, 2015
 Romeo and Juliet (Prokofiev), Sergei Prokofiev, 1938
 Romeo and Juliet (Cranko), Sergei Prokofiev, 1962
 Romeo and Juliet (MacMillan), Sergei Prokofiev, 1965
 Romeo and Juliet (Lavery), Sergei Prokofiev, 1965 
 Romeo and Juliet (Nureyev), Sergei Prokofiev, 1977
 Romeo + Juliet, Sergei Prokofiev, 2007 
 Romeo and Juliet (Pastor), Sergei Prokofiev, 2008
 La Rose, la violette et le papillon, Peter of Oldenburg, 1857
 Roxana, the Beauty of Montenegro, Ludwig Minkus, 1878 
 The Runaway, to music by Nico Muhly, James Blake, Jay-Z and Kanye West, 2018
 Russian Seasons, to music by Leonid Desyatnikov, 2006

S

 The Sacrifices to Cupid, Ludwig Minkus, 1886
 Sahdji (ballet), William Grant Still, 1930
 Sandpaper Ballet, Leroy Anderson, 1999
 The Sanguine Fan, Edward Elgar, 1917
 Sarabande and Danse (Clifford), to music by Claude Debussy, 1970
 Sarabande and Danse (d'Amboise), to music by Claude Debussy, 1975
 Scènes de ballet (Stravinsky), Igor Stravinsky, 1944
 Scènes de ballet (Ashton), Igor Stravinsky, 1948
 Scènes de ballet (Wheeldon), Igor Stravinsky, 1999  
 Scherzo à la Russe, to music by Igor Stravinsky, 1972  
 Schlagobers, Richard Strauss, 1924 
 Scotch Symphony, to music by Felix Mendelssohn, 1952
 The Seagull, Rodion Shchedrin, 1980
 The Seasons, Alexander Glazunov, 1900
 The Seasons (Cage), John Cage, 1947
 The Seasons' Canon, to music by Max Richter and Antonio Vivaldi, 2016
 Serenade, to music by Pyotr Ilyich Tchaikovsky, 1934
 Seven Beauties, Gara Garayev, 1952
 The Shagreen Bone, Yuri Khanon, 1992 
 Simple Symphony (Walter Gore), to music by Benjamin Britten, 1944
 Simple Symphony, to music by Benjamin Britten, 2009
 Slaughter on Tenth Avenue, Richard Rodgers, 1936
 The Slave, Cesare Pugni, 1868
 The Sleeping Beauty, Pyotr Ilyich Tchaikovsky, 1890
 Slice to Sharp, to music by Antonio Vivaldi, 2006
 Sokoli e Mirusha, Akil Mark Koci, 1974
 Solitaire, to music by Malcolm Arnold, 1956
 La Somnambule, ou L'Arrivée d'un nouveau seigneur, Ferdinand Hérold, 1827
 Sonate di Scarlatti, to music by Domenico Scarlatti, 1979
 Sonatine, to music by Maurice Ravel, 1975
 Song of the Earth, to music by Gustav Mahler, 1965
 La sonnambula, to music by Vincenzo Bellini, 1946
 La Source (Saint-Léon), Léo Delibes and Ludwig Minkus, 1866
 La Source (Balanchine), to music by Léo Delibes, 1968
 Špalíček, Bohuslav Martinů, 1933
 Spartacus, Aram Khachaturian, 1956
 Le Spectre de la rose, to music by Carl Maria von Weber, 1911
 The Spider's Feast, Albert Roussel, 1912
 Square Dance, to music by Antonio Vivaldi and Arcangelo Corelli, 1957
 Stamping Ground, to music by Carlos Chávez, 1983 
 Stars and Stripes, to music by John Philip Sousa, 1958
 The Steadfast Tin Soldier, to music by Georges Bizet, 1975
 Still Life at the Penguin Cafe, Simon Jeffes, 1988
 The Stone Flower, Alexander Fridlender, 1944
 Stravinsky Violin Concerto, to music by Igor Stravinsky, 1972
 Suite of Dances, to music by Leonard Bernstein, 1980
 The Sun Also Rises, Billy Novick, 2013
 Swan Lake, Pyotr Ilyich Tchaikovsky, 1877
 Swan Lake (1895), Pyotr Ilyich Tchaikovsky, 1895
 Swan Lake (Balanchine), Pyotr Ilyich Tchaikovsky, 1951
 Swan Lake (Bourne), Pyotr Ilyich Tchaikovsky, 1995
 Sweeney Todd, Malcolm Arnold, 1959
 Swimmer, to music by Shinji Eshima, 2015
 La Sylphide, Jean Schneitzhoeffer, 1832
 Les Sylphides, to music by Frédéric Chopin, 1909
 Sylvia, Léo Delibes, 1876
 Symphonic Variations, to music by César Franck, 1946
 Symphony in C, to music by Georges Bizet, 1947
 Symphony in E flat, to music by Igor Stravinsky, 1972
 Symphony in Three Movements, to music by Igor Stravinsky, 1972 
 Symphony No. 1, to music by Pyotr Ilyich Tchaikovsky, 1981

T

 The Tale of the Stone Flower, Sergei Prokofiev, 1954
 The Talisman, Riccardo Drigo, 1889
 The Taming of the Shrew, to music by Domenico Scarlatti, 1969
 Tango (Balanchine), to music by Igor Stravinsky, 1982
 Tango (Martins), to music by Igor Stravinsky, 1984  
 Tarantella to music by Louis Moreau Gottschalk, 1954
 Terpsichore, Cesare Pugni, 1861
 Theme and Variations, to music by Pyotr Ilyich Tchaikovsky, 1947
 Thou Swell, to music by Richard Rodgers, 2003
 The Three-Cornered Hat, Manuel de Falla, 1919
 Three Preludes, to music by George Gershwin, 1992 
 The Times Are Racing, to music by Dan Deacon, 2017
 Tiresias, Constant Lambert, 1951   
 Titania, Cesare Pugni, 1866 
 Le Tombeau de Couperin, to music by Maurice Ravel, 1975 
 Tom Sawyer, to music by Maury Yeston, 2011
 Touch, Richard Peaslee, 1996
 Le Train bleu, Darius Milhaud, 1924 
 Trapèze, Sergei Prokofiev, 1924 
 The Traveling Dancer, Cesare Pugni, 1864
 Triadisches Ballett, Paul Hindemith, 1922
 Tributary, to music by Wolfgang Amadeus Mozart, 2000
 Tribute, to music by Johann Sebastian Bach, 2005
 Tricolore, Georges Auric, 1978 
 Trilby, Yuli Gerber, 1870
 Triptych, to music by Béla Bartók, 2000
 The Triumph of Death, Thomas Koppel, 1971
 Tsar Kandavl or Le Roi Candaule, Cesare Pugni, 1868
 Tschaikovsky Pas de Deux, to music by Pyotr Ilyich Tchaikovsky, 1960
 Tschaikovsky Piano Concerto No. 2, to music by Pyotr Ilyich Tchaikovsky, 1941 
 Tschaikovsky Suite No. 3, to music by Pyotr Ilyich Tchaikovsky, 1970
 Twinkliana, to music by Wolfgang Amadeus Mozart, 1990
 Two Birds with the Wings of One, Bright Sheng, 2006
 The Two Stars, Cesare Pugni, 1871

U
 The Unanswered Question, to music by Charles Ives, 1988
 Union Jack, to music adapted by Hershy Kay, 1976

V

 Valley of Shadows, to music by Pyotr Ilyich Tchaikovsky, 1983
 La Valse, to music by Maurice Ravel, 1951
 Valse triste, to music by Jean Sibelius, 1985
 Variations, to music by Igor Stravinsky, 1966  
 Variations for Orchestra, to music by Igor Stravinsky, 1982
 The Vertiginous Thrill of Exactitude, to music by Franz Schubert, 1996
 Vespro, Bruno Moretti, 2002
 The Vestal, Mikhail Ivanov, 1888
 Victoria and Merrie England, to music by Arthur Sullivan, 1897
 Vienna Waltzes, to music by Johann Strauss II, Franz Lehár, and Richard Strauss, 1977 
 La Vivandière or Markitenka, Cesare Pugni, 1844
 Voices of Spring, to music by Johann Strauss II, 1977

W

 Walpurgisnacht, to music by Charles Gounod, 1980
 Watermill, to music by Teiji Ito, 1972
 Western Symphony, to American folk tunes, 1954 
 West Side Story Suite, to music by Leonard Bernstein, 1995
 Within the Golden Hour, Ezio Bosso and to music by Antonio Vivaldi, 2008
 The Whims of the Butterfly, Nikolai Krotkov, 1889
 Who Cares?, to music by George Gershwin, 1970 
 Why am I not where you are, Thierry Escaich, 2010 
 Wild Swans, Elena Kats-Chernin, 2003
 Winter Dreams, to music by Pyotr Ilyich Tchaikovsky, 1991
 The Winter's Tale, Joby Talbot, 2014
 The Wise Virgins, to music by Johann Sebastian Bach, 1940 
 The Witch, to music by Maurice Ravel, 1950
 The Wooden Prince, Béla Bartók, 1917 
 Woodland Sketches, to music  by Edward MacDowell, 1988
Woolf Works, Max Richter, 2015

X

 X-Ray, to music by John Adams, 1994

Y

 Year of the Rabbit, to music by Sufjan Stevens, 2012
 Yugen, to music by Leonard Bernstein, 2018

Z

 Zakouski, to music by Sergei Rachmaninoff, Igor Stravinsky, Sergei Prokofiev, Pyotr Ilyich Tchaikovsky, 1992
 Zenobia, 1936
 Zoraiya, Ludwig Minkus, 1881

 Zorba the ballet, music by Mikis Theodorakis

See also
 List of historical ballet characters

Title